Sector 62 (commonly known as Phase 8) is  locality, with important administrative buildings located in Mohali, Punjab. Gurdwara Amb Sahib, historical Gurdwara related to Guru Har Rai is situated here. It is covered with Lamba, Sector 69, 63 and Phase 7, Mohali. The only bus stand of Mohali is present in this sector. Various parks includes Dusshera Ground, Sabzi Mandi etc.

Facility

Administrative Offices
 Punjab Urban Planning and Development Authority, Headquarters
 Punjab School Education Board, Headquarters
 Rural Development and Panchayati Raj, Headquarters
 Regional Transport Authority
 Police Station, Phase 8
 Mohali Bus Stand

Healthcare
 Fortis Healthcare
 Cosmo Hospital

Religious
 Gurdwara Amb Sahib - Historical shrine of Sikhs
 Gurdwara Angitha Sahib - Shrine of Sant Isher Singh.

Access
Sector 62 is situated on Mohali  road. It is well connected with road, rail and air. The nearest airports are Chandigarh Airport and railway station at Industrial Area - Phase 9. Auto rickshaw are easily available for commuting. A few CTU local buses also available.

References

Mohali
Sectors of Mohali